PS-ON Signal is a remote on/off signal to a personal computer power supply unit. It turns on the power supply when it is switched from high to low and turns off the power supply when switched from low to high, or open-circuited.

References

Power supplies